Ottoman Zeila was a region centered around Zeila that was under intermittent Ottoman control between the 16th and 19th centuries , after the collapse of the Adal Sultanate.

History
From 1840 until the 1855, the governor of Zeila was Haji Shirmarke. Although prior to him, the governorship was hereditary and appointed to Sayyids, his ascent was due to the influence and wealth he acquired from his career as a captain of a training dhow. He obtained the position also partly due to gratitude from Great Britain for protecting the crew of the Mary Ann, a brig that was attacked off Berbera in 1825.

See also

History of Somalia
List of Muslim empires and dynasties
List of Sunni Muslim dynasties

References

States and territories established in the 16th century
States and territories disestablished in the 19th century
Former sultanates in the medieval Horn of Africa
16th-century establishments in Africa
19th-century disestablishments in Africa
Medieval Somalia
Early Modern history of Somalia